Obsessive love or obsessive love disorder (OLD) is a proposed condition in which one person feels an overwhelming obsessive desire to possess and protect another person, sometimes with an inability to accept failure or rejection. Symptoms include an inability to tolerate any time spent without that person, obsessive fantasies surrounding the person, and spending inordinate amounts of time seeking out, making, or looking at images of that person.

Characteristics
While obsessive love is not contained in the DSM-5 or other diagnostic manuals as a specific mental disorder, it is believed to accompany other mental illnesses. Depending on the intensity of their attraction, obsessive lovers may feel entirely unable to restrain themselves from extreme behaviors such as acts of violence toward themselves or others. Obsessive love is thought to sometimes have its roots in childhood trauma and may begin at first sight; it may persist indefinitely, sometimes requiring psychotherapy.

The disorder most commonly associated with obsessive love is borderline personality disorder. Other disorders that are most commonly associated with obsessive love include delusional disorder, obsessive-compulsive disorder, and other cluster B personality disorders.

Psychology

Sigmund Freud considered that obsessive love might be underpinned by an unconscious feeling of hate for which it overcompensated - thereby explaining the sufferer's feeling of a need to protect the love object. Later analysts saw obsessive love as driven more by narcissistic need, the preoccupation with the love-object offering defenses against worries and depressive feelings; while Jungians see it as rooted in the projection of the inner self onto another person.

In culture

Marcel Proust dissected (his own style of) obsessive love in À la recherche du temps perdu.

Bollywood films such as Darr, Anjaam, and Dastak each portray the main villains as obsessive lovers. 

You, a 2014 thriller novel by Caroline Kepnes, portrays obsessive love disorder. The novel was adapted into the first season of the Lifetime and Netflix television series You.

See also

References

Further reading
 
 

Behavioral addiction
Interpersonal relationships
Intimate relationships
Love
Seduction